Galym Akhmetov (born 20 March 1995) is a Kazakh cyclist riding for .

Major results
2016
 10th Overall Tour de Gironde
2017
 3rd Overall Tour of Mersin
 3rd GP Capodarco
2018
 1st  Overall Tour of Fatih Sultan Mehmet
1st Stage 1

External links
Galym Akhmetov at Cqranking
Galym Akhmetov at procyclingstats

1995 births
Living people
Kazakhstani male cyclists
20th-century Kazakhstani people
21st-century Kazakhstani people